The 1969 European Weightlifting Championships were held at the Torwar Hall in Warsaw, Poland from September 20 to September 28, 1969. This was the 48th edition of the event. There were 108 men in action from 19 nations. This tournament was a part of 1969 World Weightlifting Championships.

Medal summary

Medal table
Ranking by Big (Total result) medals

References
Results (Chidlovski.net)
М. Л. Аптекарь. «Тяжёлая атлетика. Справочник.» — М.: «Физкультура и спорт», 1983. — 416 с. 

European Weightlifting Championships
European Weightlifting Championships
European Weightlifting Championships
International weightlifting competitions hosted by Poland
Sports competitions in Warsaw
1960s in Warsaw